Kim Hyo-Jun (born 13 October 1978) is a South Korean retired footballer who played as defender.

References

External links 

1978 births
Living people
Association football defenders
South Korean footballers
Daejeon Korail FC players
Gyeongnam FC players
Goyang KB Kookmin Bank FC players
FC Anyang players
Korea National League players
K League 1 players
K League 2 players